The 1989 Big Sky Conference men's basketball tournament was held March 9–11 at the BSU Pavilion at Boise State University in Boise, Idaho.

Regular season co-champions Idaho and Boise State, defending tournament champions and host, met in the  championship game. Both had  conference records with five overall losses, and had split their season series with home wins. Under first-year head coach Kermit Davis, Idaho prevailed,  It was the Vandals' third Big Sky tournament title; the wins in 1981 and 1982 were under head coach Don Monson.

Idaho was also the reigning conference champion in football.

Format
The tournament format was modified again in 1989, with the field reduced from eight to six teams. The top two teams in the league standings received a bye, and the next four played in the quarterfinals.

Bracket

NCAA tournament
The Vandals received the automatic bid to the NCAA tournament, and were seeded thirteenth in the West Regional. They played UNLV in the first round in Boise and lost by twelve points.

References

Big Sky Conference men's basketball tournament
Tournament
Big Sky Conference men's basketball tournament
Big Sky Conference men's basketball tournament
Basketball competitions in Boise, Idaho
College sports tournaments in Idaho